Miguel Pedro López (born June 9, 1988 in Ensenada) is an Argentine footballer who plays for Real Pilar.

Club career

South America
López began his career in the youth ranks of Gimnasia La Plata. In 2005, he moved to Deportivo Coreano. After three years with Coreano, López joined Defensores de Cambaceres. After a fine season with Defensores de Cambaceres he was signed by Quilmes. While with Quilmes López appeared in 21 league matches and helped his side earn promotion to the Primera Division in August 2010. While in Argentina López appeared in 69 league matches and scored 6 goals.

United States
On January 28, 2011, LA Galaxy signed López on a loan deal from Quilmes. He made his MLS debut on March 26, 2011 as a second-half substitute in a 4-1 loss to Real Salt Lake He scored his first goal for Galaxy on May 28, in a 1-0 win over New England Revolution on an assist from David Beckham.

The loan deal with Galaxy expired on December 31, 2011 and López returned to Quilmes.

Banants
López left Banants at the end of the 2015–16 season.

Career statistics

Club

Honors
LA Galaxy
MLS Cup (1): 2011
Major League Soccer Supporters' Shield (1): 2011
Major League Soccer Western Conference Championship (1): 2011

Banants
Armenian Cup (1): 2015–16

References

External links
 
 

1988 births
Living people
Argentine footballers
Argentine expatriate footballers
Footballers from La Plata
Association football midfielders
Club de Gimnasia y Esgrima La Plata footballers
Defensores de Cambaceres footballers
Quilmes Atlético Club footballers
LA Galaxy players
FC Gandzasar Kapan players
CSyD Tristán Suárez footballers
FC Urartu players
Racing de Olavarría footballers
CA Excursionistas players
Real Pilar Fútbol Club players
Armenian Premier League players
Major League Soccer players
Argentine Primera División players
Primera Nacional players
Primera B Metropolitana players
Argentine expatriate sportspeople in the United States
Argentine expatriate sportspeople in Armenia
Expatriate soccer players in the United States
Expatriate footballers in Armenia